Dodamarg taluka is a taluka in Sindhudurg district in the Indian state of Maharashtra.

Dodamarg Taluka is situated between latitudes 15° 37' N and 15° 60' north and longitudes 73° 19' E and 73° 40' east. It is bordered by the Goa state to the south and west, Karnataka to the southeast and Sahyadri range to the east with a total area of 45053 hectares. Dodamarg is the smallest taluka in Sindhudurg district. According to the census of 2001, the taluka has 53 villages. Both Marathi and Malwani are widely spoken. Marathi is, however, the official language of the Dodamarg. Sex ratio in Dodamarg is 1054 i.e. for each 1000 males, which is below national average of 940 as per census 2011. Literacy rate in Dodamarg is 76.3%. Population of Dodamarg taluka is 50,032 persons as per latest provisional figures released by directorate of census operation in Sindhudurg, which shows a decrease of 2.30 percent in 2011 compared to figures of 2001 census. Dodamarg is a hilly region broken by valleys and surrounded by mountains.

The main rivers flowing across the taluka is Tilari. Tilari dam is constructed on this river. Kalne river is one of the tributary of this river.

There is a village named Mangeli at the eastern end Dodamarg taluka as well as on the border of Karnataka state. There are viewing points at Unneyi Bandharam, inter-state project of Tilari Dam, Rock Garden, the fort of Pargad and Hunumant Gad, Tervan Medhe, Kasainath Hill, Devotional places of faith like Nagnath Temple and elsewhere. The interstate dam project taken up under the auspices of Irrigation Dept. of Goa and Maharashtra State Govt. The Dam is constructed on Tilari river in Dodamarg Taluka. There is a large lake or reservoir formed by the Tilari Dam. Now-a-days, a number of wild elephants take shelter in the surroundings of Tilari. The dam and the lake at the distance of 45 km from Goa State, attract tourists as well as observers. The Wirdi fall in Dodamarg Taluka is so far an untouched site, at the distance of 20 km from Dodamarg Taluka place.

For the last 10 to 15 years, people from Kerala have done deep study of land, water, and environment of this area and started plantation of Pineapples along with Banana. Now pineapple is one of the main products of taluka. Recent years elephants are also marking entry into Dodamarg taluka from Karnataka state through Khanapur jungle. This is the first time, elephants have found habitation in Maharashtra State. Tilari major irrigation project area (Dodamarg Taluka) is the main habitat. People of dodamarg Also planting the pineapple and banana and sell it to the Mumbai or local market including North Goa.

Places of interest 
The Pargad Fort was built by Chatrapati Shivaji Maharaj in 1674 to 1676 AD, on adjoining borders of Kolhapur and Sindhudurg Districts. Structurally it looks like a conch-shell. The fort was suitable to keep watch on the movement of the enemy in Goa as well as Konkan.

 Vijghar 66 MW power house
 Tilari Dam
 Pargadh - Fort
 Hanumanthgadh, Fukeri.
 Rajringan Waterfall, Fukeri.
 Megnis Sunset Point, Fukeri.
 Mangeli Water Fall
 Kasainath Mountain
 Nagnath Temple Medhe
 Virdi Water Fall
 Virdi Dam
 Talkat Garden
 Sasoli caves
 Mahalaxmi Power project konalkatta
 Parme river (bridge)
 Mangeli Ghat
 Bhekurli Sada
 Mangeli Sada
 Tilari Bionatural Farm

Places of worship 

 Sateri/Bhavai Mandir (Kudase)
 Daloba Mandir (Ghotgewadi)
 Mangeli Ghat
 Sateri Purmar Mandir (Ghotgewadi)
 Damodar Temple (Bhedshi)
 Sateri Kelbai Temple Kasai Dodamarg
 Rastroli Siddheshwar Temple Dhatwadi Kasai Dodamarg
 Ganesh temple Dodamarg
 Hanuman Mandir Dodamarg
 Rashtroli Datt Mandir sawantwada Dodamarg
 Pimpaleshwar Dodamarg
 Kasainath Mountain Dodamarg
 Saibaba Mandir Dhatwadi Dodamarg
 Nagnath Mandir Medhe
 Parme Sateri Devi Mandir
 Parme River
 Shri Sateri Bhutnath Temple, Sonawal
 Shri Sateri Devi Mandir, Mangeli-Deoolwadi
 Hanuman Mandir, Mangeli ( Kusgewadi )
 Shri Devi Mauli Temple, Fukeri.
 Shri Navdurga Temple sateri mahadev and ravalnath temple Ayee
 Mauli Devi Mandir , maneri.
 Gopinath Mandir ,maneri(Badamewadi)
 Shri Shantadurga Mandir (Khokaral)
 Shri Siddhivinayak Mandir (Vaingantad)

External links
 Dodamarg Darshan

Cities and towns in Sindhudurg district
Talukas in Maharashtra
Talukas in Sindhudurg district